Sam Instone (born 3 August 1977) is a British businessman who is the founder and current chief executive of AES International.  This organization became the fastest growing UK financial services business between 2008 and 2012 and was the winner of Sunday Times/Virgin Fast Track United Kingdom's Best Management Team Award. In the wake of the financial crisis, he is well known for promoting the mission statement 'Positive Change' as a means for the financial services sector to get better consumer, employee and corporate outcomes through the adoption of stronger core values, regulatory governance and transparency.

Career 

A graduate in War Studies from King's College London and The Royal Military Academy Sandhurst, Instone served as an Airborne Officer in the operational and ceremonial squadrons of The Household Cavalry Regiment. In 2004 he founded the international financial services organisation, AES International in Geneva which relocated to London in 2007. Initially specializing in the provision of financial services to those in hostile areas or hazardous professions he diversified AES into more mainstream and conventional international markets at this time.

Instone aligned the organisation of this business to the core values, mission, structure, doctrine and operations of the western military in a manner that has become known as 'militology'. This led to The Economist Magazine describing Instone as 'The Field Marshal of Finance' and discussing the merits of applying military principles to commercial environments. These ideas first became the subject of post graduate academic study at Aston Business School and latterly at the EDHEC Business School in France as a credible management theory for organizing commercial businesses in the wake of 2007–2012 global financial crisis.

Instone was a finalist in the 2013 Ernst and Young Entrepreneur of the Year awards and was recognised by Sir Richard Branson for his work in promoting militology as a credible business management strategy. He featured as an expert witness on the BBC Panorama episode entitled 'Who Stole My Pension' and regularly appears in national television and media features to discuss problems and possible solutions within the international financial services marketplace.

Personal life 

Instone is a descendant of Sir Samuel Instone (1878–1937) the shipping and aviation entrepreneur and the founder of the Instone Air Line.  A member of the Skinners Livery Company, he was Honorary Treasurer of The London Polo Club and remains a Partner in The London Polo Academy.  He married Kate in 2006 and has two sons and a daughter.

References 

1977 births
Living people
British businesspeople
Alumni of King's College London
Associates of King's College London